Charles Claude Husson (1847 in Mirecourt, Vosges – 1915) was an influential French archetier (bow maker).

Charles Claude Husson was the son of the archetier Charles Claude Nicolas Husson. 
He served his apprenticeship under his father, almost at the same time as Joseph Arthur Vigneron. In 1873, he entered Jean-Baptiste Vuillaume's workshop and stayed with him until Vuillaume's death in 1875. 

According to experts, in 1875 he joined François Nicolas Voirin for some time and, around 1878, started working for Gand & Bernandel Frères. Around 1880 Husson established his own workshop in Paris at 14, rue du Faubourg Saint Denis.

References 

 
 
 
 
 

1847 births
1915 deaths
Luthiers from Mirecourt
Bow makers